Jason Barsley (born 10 March 1978) is an Australian former rugby league footballer who played for the North Queensland Cowboys in the National Rugby League.

Playing career
Born in Brisbane, Queensland, Barsley played his junior rugby league for the Mareeba Gladiators before playing for the Cairns Cyclones and Central Comets in the Queensland Cup. He joined the North Queensland Cowboys for the 2003 season.

In Round 13 of the 2003 NRL season, he made his NRL debut in the Cowboys' 24–28 golden point loss to the Penrith Panthers, scoring a try. He added two more NRL games for the Cowboys in his debut season, spending the majority of the season playing for the North Queensland Young Guns in the Queensland Cup.

In 2004, Barsley joined the Easts Tigers. He enjoyed a successful season in the Queensland Cup, starting at fullback in Easts' Grand Final loss to the Burleigh Bears, being named the club's Player of the Year and being selected for the Queensland Residents side.

Barsley returned to the Cowboys in 2005, spending the majority of the year playing for the North Queensland Young Guns in the Queensland Cup. He played one NRL game in 2005, scoring the Cowboys' only try in a 4–34 loss to the St George Illawarra Dragons. After another season with the Young Guns in 2006, Barsley was released by the club.

Statistics

NRL
 Statistics are correct to the end of the 2005 season

References

1978 births
Living people
Australian rugby league players
Eastern Suburbs Tigers players
North Queensland Cowboys players
Central Queensland Capras players
Rugby league centres
Rugby league wingers
Rugby league players from Brisbane